Augusto M. Seabra has been a music and cinema critic since 1977. He writes many articles to the Portuguese newspaper Público. And he has been a regular presence in a lot of film festivals such as Cannes, San Sebastian and Turin. He was president of Saldanha Cultural Association and director of programme of Monumental Festivals 1995 and 1996. He has also been responsible for a lot of cinema cycles such as Riscos from Doclisboa, since 2007. Augusto was a music consultant in Seixas Santos movie E o tempo passa. He was also commissioner of  OrquestrUtópica concerts - “Metropolis – Música e Política” e “BMC – NYC, Black Mountain College – New York City”.

References

http://letradeforma.blogs.sapo.pt
http://www.publico.pt/autor/augusto-m-seabra

Portuguese film critics
Portuguese music critics
Living people
Year of birth missing (living people)
Place of birth missing (living people)